Fence Lake is a census-designated place located in southwestern Cibola County, New Mexico, United States. Designated in 1980 by the United States Census Bureau, Fence Lake had a population of 42 as of the 2010 census. The area is largely ranchland, and there are few businesses there. It was named after a small village which is contained within its boundaries.

Demographics

As of the 2010 census, the population of the Fence Lake CDP was 42, consisting of 23 households, of which 11 were families. Females were 54.8% of the population. The racial make-up of the CDP was 26.2% Native American, 71.4% White, and 2.4% Asian. Hispanic or Latino of any race was 4.8% of the population.

Geography

Average rainfall, inches: January 1.1; February 1.1; March 1.2; April 0.7; May 0.7; June 0.5; July 2.4; August 2.6; September 1.6; October 0.9; November 0.9; December 1.0; Year 14.8

Post office
There is a post office located in the village of Fence Lake, serving the zip code 87315.

Education
The area is within the Quemado Schools school district.

Aggressive Christianity Missionary Training Corps

Shim Ra Na Ekklisia (also called Miracle River) is located near Fence Lake. In July 1997, Deborah and Jim Green purchased , originally parts of the old Tingle Ranch at that location from Jonnie Head Real Estate. The Greens use the Fence Lake Post Office to mail out their publications.

See also

 List of census-designated places in New Mexico

References

External links

 New Mexico Highways Page

Census-designated places in Cibola County, New Mexico
Census-designated places in New Mexico